"50 Ways to Say Goodbye" is a song by American pop rock band Train. It is the second single from their sixth studio album, California 37 and is the fifth track on the album. It is considered to be adult contemporary pop radio music. It was released in the United States on June 11, 2012. It is their most recent top 40 hit, peaking at number 20 on the Hot 100. It was certified gold by the RIAA on September 20, 2012.

Although the song is called "50 Ways to Say Goodbye," the song only references 11 unique excuses.

Composition
"50 Ways to Say Goodbye" is a pop rock song in the key of E minor. It is in common time with a tempo of 140 beats per minute. It utilizes electric guitars and a mariachi influenced brass section and acoustic guitar.

Singer Pat Monahan said the song "was just a gag about a girl breaking up with a boy and being just so immature that the only way to handle it was just to tell your friends that she's dead."

The lyrics are a tongue-in-cheek narrative where, to save face, the singer claims he will say his girlfriend died in a variety of outlandish ways rather than admit she dumped him. The song had some inspiration from Paul Simon's "50 Ways to Leave Your Lover" and was originally going to be titled "50 Ways to Kill Your Lover". That title was tossed as it could attract controversy.

The theme of the song also follows the 1998 release of The Vandals’ "My Girlfriend's Dead" from their album Hitler Bad, Vandals Good, written by Warren Fitzgerald, in which rather than face the reality that his girlfriend left him, he tells that his girlfriend died in a variety of ways.

Critical reception
Nick Bassett of The Re-View compared "50 Ways to Say Goodbye" to its predecessor, saying that "whilst it lacks that Summery carefree vibe [of "Drive By"], this newbie is still buoyed by a jaunty radio-friendly chorus".

Music video
The music video was directed by Marc Klasfeld and features David Hasselhoff, Taryn Manning, Jonathan Lipnicki, and a Mariachi trio, in addition to band members Pat Monahan, Jimmy Stafford, and Scott Underwood (Stafford and Underwood have since left the band). The video is set in a supermarket with Monahan explaining to Hasselhoff and various other customers and staff members the absence of his girlfriend. Stafford portrays the store cashier and Underwood plays the butcher, while the girlfriend is played by Manning. The grocery store scenes are interspersed with cutaways to the various excuses Pat makes for his girlfriend's absence, as well as scenes of the band performing onstage. Towards the end of the video, a fan who was holding up signs consoling Pat for the supposed loss of his girlfriend finally holds up a sign that says "Rack City Bitch", a reference to "Rack City" by Tyga. At the end of the video, Pat's girlfriend is revealed to be alive, and says hello to him and Hasselhoff, who stand awkwardly as she continues her shopping.

Track listing
Digital download
"50 Ways to Say Goodbye" – 4:08

CD single
"50 Ways to Say Goodbye" – 4:08
"Brand New Book" – 3:47

Credits
Pat Monahan - songwriter, lead vocals
Espen Lind - songwriter, producer, additional guitars, bass, keyboards, backing vocals, programming
Amund Bjorklund - songwriter, producer, programming
Jimmy Stafford - guitar
Scott Underwood - drums
Hector Maldonado - bass
Jerry Becker - keyboards
Brad Magers - horns

Charts

Weekly charts

Year-end charts

Certifications

Release history

References

Songs about parting
2012 singles
Train (band) songs
Music videos directed by Marc Klasfeld
Songs written by Amund Bjørklund
Songs written by Espen Lind
Songs written by Pat Monahan
Song recordings produced by Butch Walker
Song recordings produced by Espionage (production team)
2012 songs
Columbia Records singles